János Gyurka (born 18 March 1962 in Zirc) is a Hungarian handball former player and coach. 
He participated at the 1988 Summer Olympics, where the Hungarian national team placed fourth. He was a silver medalist at the 1986 World Men's Handball Championship. He is head coach for the club Mosonmagyaróvári KC SE.

References

1962 births
Living people
Sportspeople from Veszprém County
Hungarian male handball players
Olympic handball players of Hungary
Handball players at the 1988 Summer Olympics
Hungarian handball coaches